CHALET was a mnemonic indicating a protocol used by UK emergency services to report situations which they may be faced with, especially as it relates to major incidents.

Since 2013, the UK emergency services have been using new doctrine  developed by the Joint Emergency Services Interoperability Principles (JESIP), which sets out the mnemonic METHANE as an aid to communicating information from the incident scene.
CHALET and METHANE dictate the form in which the receiving control station should get information from the first person or officer on scene.  In some jurisdictions, the alternative ETHANE may be used.

CHALET stands for:
Casualties - Approximate numbers of dead, injured and uninjured
Hazards - Present and potential
Access - Best access routes for emergency vehicles, bottlenecks to avoid etc.
Location - The precise location of the incident
Emergency - Emergency services already on scene, and what others are required
Type - Type of Incident, including details of numbers of vehicles, buildings etc. involved

METHANE stands for:
major incident declared?
exact location;
type of incident e.g. explosion, building collapse;
hazards present, potential or suspected;
access – routes that are safe to use;
number, type, severity of casualties;
emergency services now present and those required
and is used to help establish shared situational awareness.

In the event of this being used for a major incident, the reporting first on scene officer would not usually get involved with the rescue work, but act as a co-ordinator on scene for arriving emergency vehicles.  This individual would often assume the role of Silver Ambulance/Police/Fire dependent on their service.  This is in line with the widely used Gold Silver Bronze command structure.

The Silver commander at an incident usually operates from a command vehicle.  Before a specially designed vehicle arrives an improvised command vehicle is appointed by leaving one vehicle's lightbar/blue lights running, whilst the others turn theirs off.

References

Emergency services in the United Kingdom
Mnemonics